The Hartwell Commercial Historic District is a  historic district in Hartwell, Georgia which was listed on the National Register of Historic Places in 1986. It includes 48 contributing buildings and one contributing structure.

It was deemed architecturally significant for its "collection of historic commercial buildings which define the historic character of Hartwell's town center. The buildings document the types, styles, building materials, and construction techniques prevalent in the commercial areas of small northeast Georgia towns in the late 19th and early 20th centuries. Types represented include stores (many with second-floor office space), banks, warehouses, and a depot. Their close concentration along the streets with consistent setbacks and party walls is typical of small Georgia towns of the period. The majority are simple late-Victorian-style buildings with detailing consisting of brick corbeling, round- and segmental-arched window openings, and parapet roofs."

Gallery

References

Historic districts on the National Register of Historic Places in Georgia (U.S. state)
Victorian architecture in Georgia (U.S. state)
Romanesque Revival architecture in Georgia (U.S. state)
Buildings and structures completed in 1879
Hart County, Georgia
National Register of Historic Places in Hart County, Georgia
Hartwell, Georgia